The 1929 season was the Chicago Bears' 10th in the National Football League. The team was unable to improve on their 7–5–1 record from 1928 and finished with a 4–9–2 record during head coach George Halas's final season.  The showing earned them a ninth-place finish in the team standings their worst record to date and first time the club finishing below .500. Chicago scored 119 points total during the season, but the defensive squad conceded 227, most in the league.

The Bears' season started promising enough, with a 4–1–1 start. However, three of those wins were against the Minneapolis Red Jackets, a team that finished the season 1–9. The final 9 games represented the worst stretch in franchise history, as the Bears went 0–8–1 to finish the season. Few of the Bears losses were even close contests. They lost three times to Green Bay, all shutouts. They also lost three times to New York. Against the Chicago Cardinals, the Bears fought them to a 0–0 tie in the first meeting, but ran into an NFL record performance in the rematch. 

Ernie Nevers, the former All-America from Stanford and owner-coach-player of the defunct Duluth Eskimos, had the game of a lifetime against Chicago on Thanksgiving Day, November 28. Nevers rushed for an NFL record 6 touchdowns and added 4 PATs for an NFL record 40 points; 6 TDs and 40 points are both still records and among the oldest standing records in NFL history (although Gale Sayers and Dub Jones tied Nevers with 6 touchdowns in a game, Nevers' 6 rushing touchdowns are still an unmatched record). The Bears were crushed 40–6, with Nevers scoring all the Cardinals' points. 

The inability of Chicago to compete with the top teams in the NFL may have been the catalyst for Halas to step down as player-coach and focus on his owner duties (Halas would return to coach in a few years). Clearly, the Bears needed more talent at the "skill positions" as the Chicago backfield was mostly unchanged since the early 1920s. One bright spot was the emergence of End Luke Johnsos, who caught two touchdown passes late in the season. In addition, the legendary Red Grange rejoined the team and regained some of his earlier form.

Future Hall of Fame players
Paddy Driscoll, back
Red Grange, back (did not play in 1928)
George Halas, end
Ed Healey, tackle
Link Lyman, tackle
George Trafton, center

Other leading players
Luke Johnsos, end (rookie from Northwestern)
Joe Kopcha, guard (rookie from Chattanooga)
William Senn, back
Joe Sternaman, quarterback
Laurie Walquist, quarterback
Packie Nelson, tackle
Sod Ryan, tackle

Schedule

Standings

References

Chicago Bears
Chicago Bears seasons
Chicago Bears